A list of films produced in the Soviet Union in 1968 (see 1968 in film).

1968

External links
 Soviet films of 1968 at the Internet Movie Database

1968
Soviet
Films